Maria Costello MBE (born 9 June 1973, Northampton, England) from Spratton in Northamptonshire, is a British motorcycle racer who held the Guinness World Record for being the fastest woman to lap the Isle of Man TT course at an average speed of 114.73 mph until Jenny Tinmouth took the record at the 2009 TT.

Racing background
Costello was the first woman (solo racer) in the history of the Isle of Man motorcycle races to stand on the podium when she took third place in the Ultra Lightweight category of the 2005 Manx Grand Prix. Riding a Honda RVF400, Costello became the first woman rider of a solo machine to take a podium finish in either a TT race or Manx GP. Her success as a female motorcycle racer and success on the track has attracted attention from the media and the motorsport industry.

In her debut appearance at the North West 200 Irish road race she came third in the 400 cc class on a Honda RVF400, placing her 7th overall, in the joint 125 cc/400 cc race. She also raced in both 600 cc classes on her Honda CBR600RR.

In 2004 at the Isle of Man TT races Costello achieved a Guinness World Record by becoming the fastest woman to lap the Snaefell mountain course at an average speed of 114.73 mph. She also finished 8th in the Senior race of the Manx Grand Prix (collecting a Silver replica award) in a field of more than 80 competitors.

Costello has won a total of eight Manx Grand Prix Silver Replicas and one TT Bronze Replica. These are trophies awarded only to those who finish within a percentage of the winner’s time.

Journalism

Costello has been contributing to the motorcycle press as a freelance journalist since her career in motorcycle racing began in 1995. Initially it was her race press releases that were published in the local newspapers but her ability on the racetrack led to an invitation to join Motorcycle News and Performance Bikes on road tests. She is now a regular contributor to the Used Bike Guide in addition to publications such as Irish Racer Magazine and Motorcycle Racer.

Film/TV career

Costello has appeared in several television programmes including an Anglia TV documentary on her return to the TT races in 2002, and she was one of a few included on TT Heroes, which followed competitors during the 2003 TT. Recently Costello was a presenter on the motorcycle show Fran's Angels. She has also been a panellist on Top Ten Bikes, and has worked as a stunt double. She doubled for Tamzin Outhwaite on a mountain bike in an ITV drama Walk Away and I Stumble. Costello was the rider-double for Oscar-winning actress Reese Witherspoon and worked alongside the lead role played by Christina Ricci.

The Discovery Channel's Big Big Bikes program featured Costello racing a Honda Fireblade motorcycle against a Porsche 911 GT3 RS. This programme, in the UK alone, was seen by a million viewers; the global release in 2006 reached audience figures of between ten and twenty million.

Costello appeared as a contestant on Dave's television programme Driving Wars, in a team of fellow bikers called biker babes.

Charity and sports promotion work

 Costello is an ambassador for the Institute of Advanced Motorists charity, with whom she has led women-only IAM RoadSmart skills days.
 Costello is a patron of Riders for Health and a supporter of MENCAP.
 As a "Sporting Champion" she visits schools and communities to encourage young people to take part in sport. In this capacity she has helped promote various sporting events, particularly in the East Midlands as part of backing the 2012 Olympics bid. She was one of the athletes invited to promote the 2005 Tour of Britain cycle race and gave a speech during the launch of the East Midlands route at Loughborough University.
 She is also a role model for the Auto Cycle Union, the governing body for two-wheeled motorsport. She is also a patron for the Women's Sport Foundation an organisation trying to bring equality to women's sport. Costello attended the BBC Sport Summit at BBC TV Centre in London, a day aimed at generating debate about the future of sport in the UK.

In 2012 Costello also worked as an occasional guest instructor for The Bike Experience, a charity organisation dedicated to helping motorcycle riders who have suffered spinal damage to ride again.

Awards
 Costello won the BBC Northampton Sports Personality of the Year 2005
 She was nominated for the East Midlands Sports Personality of the Year Award 2005
 She has also won the Manx Motor Cycle Club – Lesley Ann Trophy. Awarded for the best performance by a female racer at the Manx GP on three occasions, 2002, 2004 and 2005. She has also received the EMRA – Outstanding Achievement Award in 2002 and 2004, and the Best Lady Award in 1995.
Costello was appointed Member of the Order of the British Empire (MBE) in the 2009 Birthday Honours.

Footnotes

1977 births
Living people
Sportspeople from Northampton
British humanitarians
English sportswomen
English motorcycle racers
Members of the Order of the British Empire
Female motorcycle racers
FIM Superstock 1000 Cup riders
People from Spratton